Agriș may refer to the following places in Romania:

Agriș, a commune in Satu Mare County
Agriș, a village in the commune Iara, Cluj County
Agriș, a tributary of the Baraolt in Covasna County
Agriș, a tributary of the Cormoș in Covasna County
Agriș, a tributary of the Iara in Cluj County
Agriș (Luț), a tributary of the Luț in Mureș County
Agriș, a tributary of the Moravița in Timiș County
Agriș, a tributary of the Mureș in Mureș County
Agriș, a tributary of the Nera in Caraș-Severin County

See also
Agrișu (disambiguation)
Agris, a French commune in the Charente department
AGRIS (International System for Agricultural Science and Technology), a global public domain database